Robert J. Macauley (February 18, 1838March 17, 1904) was a Scottish American immigrant, lawyer, legislator, and judge.  He was active for most of his adult life as a district attorney and county judge in Dunn County, Wisconsin.  In some historical documents his name is spelled McCauley.

Biography

Born in Glasgow, Scotland, Macauley immigrated to the United States with his family in 1842.  They initially settled on a farm in Hancock County, Illinois, where his father died five years later.  Robert worked on the farm and obtained a basic education until 1852, when most of the family moved north to another farm near Menomonie, Wisconsin.  He worked on the new family farm until 1864, when he began studying law in the office of Judge E. B. Bundy, who was married to Macauley's sister, Reubena Hadlock Macauley. But after six months of study, he enlisted for service with the Union Army in the American Civil War.

He was enrolled as a private in Company G, 16th Wisconsin Volunteer Infantry Regiment.  The 16th Wisconsin was organized under General William Tecumseh Sherman's Military Division of the Mississippi.  Macauley arrived with the regiment just after the Atlanta campaign, and participated in Sherman's March to the Sea and the Carolinas campaign.

On July 1, 1865, Macauley returned to Menomonie and continued his studies under Judge Bundy, and, in January 1867, he was admitted to the State Bar of Wisconsin at Eau Claire.  Judge Bundy then took him on as a partner in his firm.

Public offices

In 1868, he was elected district attorney of Dunn County; he served until 1873, earning re-election in 1870.  In November 1873, he was elected County Judge for Dunn County and served two four year terms.  The November after leaving office as County Judge, he was elected to represent Dunn County in the Wisconsin State Assembly as a Republican in the first election in the state for two-year assembly terms.  He did not run for re-election in 1884.  He was City Attorney for Menomonie from 1882 until 1890, when he was elected to another term as district attorney.  He served a final four-year term as County Judge from 1898 to 1902.

Personal life and family

Judge Macauley married Cora Olson of Menomonie on May 9, 1869.  They had one son and one daughter.

Macauley was a member of the Grand Army of the Republic from the time of its organization, and a member of the Episcopal Church.  His farm was approximately four hundred acres and was located about twelve miles outside Menomonie.

Judge Macauley died in Menomonie, Wisconsin, on March 17, 1904.

Electoral history

| colspan="6" style="text-align:center;background-color: #e9e9e9;"| General Election, November 7, 1882

References

External links
 Robert J. Macauley at Find a Grave

1838 births
1904 deaths
Politicians from Glasgow
People from Hancock County, Illinois
People from Menomonie, Wisconsin
People of Wisconsin in the American Civil War
Scottish emigrants to the United States
County officials in Wisconsin
Wisconsin state court judges
Members of the Wisconsin State Assembly
19th-century American politicians
19th-century American judges